Léo Missir (1925–2009) was a French composer.

1925 births
2009 deaths
French composers
French male composers
French record producers
20th-century French musicians
20th-century French male musicians